Anne Schilling is an American mathematician specializing in algebraic combinatorics, representation theory, and mathematical physics. She is a professor of mathematics at the University of California, Davis.

Education
Schilling completed her Ph.D. in 1997 at Stony Brook University. Her dissertation, Bose-Fermi Identities and Bailey Flows in Statistical Mechanics and Conformal Field Theory, was supervised by Barry M. McCoy. From 1997 until 1999, she was a postdoctoral fellow at the Institute for Theoretical Physics at Amsterdam University and from 1999 until 2001, she was a C.L.E. Moore Instructor at the Mathematics Department at M.I.T.. After that she joined the faculty at the Department of Mathematics at UC Davis.

Books
With Thomas Lam, Luc Lapointe, Jennifer Morse, Mark Shimozono, and Mike Zabrocki, Schilling is the author of the research monograph -Schur Functions and Affine Schubert Calculus (Fields Institute Monographs 33, Springer, 2014).

With Isaiah Lankham and Bruno Nachtergaele, Schilling is the author of the textbook on linear algebra, Linear Algebra as an Introduction to Abstract Mathematics (World Scientific, 2016).

With Daniel Bump, she is the author of a more advanced book on crystal bases in representation theory, Crystal Bases: Representations and Combinatorics (World Scientific, 2017).

Recognition
Schilling was included in the 2019 class of fellows of the American Mathematical Society "for contributions to algebraic combinatorics, combinatorial representation theory, and mathematical physics and for service to the profession". For the academic year 2012–2013 she was awarded a Simons Fellowship. In 2002 she received a Humboldt Research Fellowship and was a Fulbright Scholar from 1992-1993 as a doctoral student. Schilling was selected to be the 43rd Emmy Noether Lecturer at the Joint Mathematics Meetings to be held in San Francisco on January 3 – 6, 2024.

References

External links
Home page

Year of birth missing (living people)
Living people
20th-century American mathematicians
21st-century American mathematicians
American women mathematicians
Combinatorialists
Mathematical physicists
Stony Brook University alumni
University of California, Davis faculty
Fellows of the American Mathematical Society
20th-century women mathematicians
21st-century women mathematicians
20th-century American women
21st-century American women